Carl S. Nygren (April 3, 1873 – December 3. 1941) was an American farmer and politician.

Nygren was born in Lake City, Minnesota, went to the local public schools and to the University of Minnesota School of Agriculture. He lived with his wife and family on a farm in Lake City, Minnesota and was a farmer and raised livestock. Nygren served in the Minnesota House of Representatives in 1911 and 1921 and was a Democrat.

References

1873 births
1941 deaths
People from Lake City, Minnesota
University of Minnesota alumni
Farmers from Minnesota
Democratic Party members of the Minnesota House of Representatives